Liu Rushi (1618–1664), also known as Yang Ai (杨爱), Liu Shi (柳是), Liu Yin (柳隐) and Yang Yin (杨隐),Yang Yinlian (杨影怜), Hedong Jun (河东君), was a Chinese yiji (courtesan), poet, calligrapher, and painter in the late Ming dynasty and early Qing dynasty.

Early in her life, she had a relationship with Chen Zilong with whom she exchanged verses. She married the scholar-official Qian Qianyi, who was 36 years her senior, at the age of 25. She committed suicide shortly after he died.

She is one of the "Eight Beauties of Qinhuai" described by late Qing official Zhang Jingqi. In addition to her creative works (many of which have survived) and independent spirit (she often cross-dressed), she has been revered in later times for her unwavering love for her husband and for her country (the Ming) during the Ming–Qing transition. Historian Chen Yinke, who spent decades researching and writing about her, characterizes Liu Rushi as "a heroine, a belle, a wordsmith, and a patriot".

Early life
Believed to have been born in Jiaxing, Liu was sold by her family as a concubine to the Prime Minister Zhou Daodeng. At the age of thirteen, a scandal led to her expulsion from Zhou's household, and she was sold to a brothel in Suzhou. At seventeen, she had her first major love affair with the painter Tang Shuda. Already a noted poet and painter herself at this early age, she met Chen Zilong in 1635 and lived with him for about a year, eventually leaving after his family disapproved of their liaison. After leaving, she managed a brothel in Wujiang. An affair with the artist Wang Janming ended when Wang failed to attend an appointment with her at the Rainbow Pavilion. Another affair with Song Yuanwen, a government official, ended when his vacillations over marriage resulted in Liu smashing her lute and storming off in a fit of pique. 

She was friends with fellow courtesan Chen Yuanyuan.

Marriage to Qian Qianyi

In 1640 Liu embarked on a campaign to marry the respected scholar Qian Qianyi. Dressed in men's clothing, she accosted Qian and requested his opinion on one of her poems. Qian apparently believed her to be a man, but later in the year he had established her at a specially built hermitage in the grounds of his Suzhou estate, called the "According to Sutra Studio". They married in 1641, whilst on a river cruise; Qian bestowing upon his bride the new name of Hedong. Although he married her as a concubine, Qian treated Liu as his principal wife, and they were married in a formal wedding ceremony. Her affinity for cross-dressing persisted after they were married; she regularly wore men's clothing whilst in public and on occasion made calls on her husband's behalf whilst dressed in his Confucian robes (this affectation earned her the nickname rushi, "Confucian Gentleman", which also puns on her chosen name Rushi).

After the collapse of the Ming dynasty in 1644, Liu tried to persuade her husband to commit suicide and martyr himself to the fallen Ming. Qian refused, instead choosing to organise the resistance movement against the newly established Qing regime. In 1648, the couple had a daughter together.

The last years of her life were difficult for Liu. In 1663, she entered the Buddhist laity, partly as a response to the destruction of her husband's substantial personal library, the Crimson Cloud-Storied Hall. After Qian's death in 1664, his creditors and enemies attempted to extort money from Liu; their machinations eventually drove her to hang herself.

List of paintings
Landscapes with Figures, album leaves, ink and color on paper. Freer Gallery of Art, Washington, D.C.

Misty Willows at the Moon Dike, 1643, handscroll, ink and color on paper. Palace Museum, Beijing.

Poetry

During her life Liu was a prolific poet, publishing four collections of her work before the age of 22. Her calligraphy was noted for its bold, masculine strokes, using the "wild-grass script" style. Her solo anthologies included Songs from the Mandarin Duck Chamber and Poems Drafted by a Lake, and her poetry was published alongside her husband's in a number of his works.

The Qing dynasty magistrate Chen Wenshu (陈文述) helped preserve her tomb and once helped rebuild it. To this day, Liu Rushi's tomb still exists.

See also
Classical Chinese poetry
Tales of Ming Courtesans, a historical novel by Alice Poon in which Liu Rushi is one of the three protagonists, the other two being Chen Yuanyuan and Li Xiangjun.

References

Further reading

Suicides by hanging in China
1618 births
1664 deaths
Ming dynasty poets
Writers from Jiaxing
Chinese women poets
17th-century Chinese poets
Poets from Zhejiang
Burials in Suzhou
17th-century Chinese women
17th-century Chinese people
Eight Beauties of Qinhuai
Painters from Zhejiang
Ming dynasty painters
Artists from Jiaxing
Chinese concubines
17th-century Chinese painters
17th-century suicides
17th-century Chinese women writers
17th-century Chinese women singers